Rudolph Hackbarth (born 10 March 1994) is a Brazilian handball player for BADA Huesca and the Brazilian national team.

He represented Brazil at the 2019 World Men's Handball Championship. He competed at the 2020 Summer Olympics.

Titles
Pan American Men's Club Handball Championship:
2017

Individual awards
2022 South and Central American Men's Handball Championship: Best right wing

References

External links

1994 births
Living people
Brazilian male handball players
Pan American Games medalists in handball
Pan American Games bronze medalists for Brazil
Handball players at the 2019 Pan American Games
Medalists at the 2019 Pan American Games
Handball players at the 2020 Summer Olympics
21st-century Brazilian people
Brazilian people of German descent